South Yorkshire Sports Stadium was a greyhound racing and speedway stadium on Station Road in Wombwell, near Barnsley, South Yorkshire. It was one of two greyhound tracks in the town; the other was called the Wombwell Greyhound Stadium.

Origins
The South Yorkshire Sports Stadium was constructed north of Station Road, south of Bulling Dike and accessed on a small road called Kent Row at the time.

Opening
It opened unofficially on Saturday 17 April 1928 with 3,000 spectators raising £15 (the nights entrance fees) for local charities. One week later on Saturday 21 April 1928 the stadium officially opened charging 1/-, 2/- or 3/- for the relevant enclosures. Speedway followed in 1929.

History
The greyhound racing was independent (not affiliated to the sports governing body the National Greyhound Racing Club) and was known as a flapping track which was the nickname given to independent tracks. The track was a popular venue with totalisator turnover peaking in 1946 at £64,255.

The greyhound racing finished during May 1956.

Speedway
Speedway was held sporadically from 1929 to 1965; the team were known as the Wombwell Colliers.

The stadium was demolished and later became the Valley Road industrial area.

References

Defunct greyhound racing venues in the United Kingdom
Defunct speedway venues in England
1928 establishments in England
Sports venues completed in 1928
1960s disestablishments in England
Sports venues in South Yorkshire